Amblyphylla is a genus of moth in the family Gelechiidae. It contains only one species, Amblyphylla lophozancla, which is found in Namibia, South Africa and Eswatini.

References

Chelariini
Monotypic moth genera
Moths of Africa